Glutathione S-transferase theta-2 is an enzyme that in humans is encoded by the GSTT2 gene.

Glutathione S-transferase (GSTs) theta 2 (GSTT2) is a member of a superfamily of proteins that catalyze the conjugation of reduced glutathione to a variety of electrophilic and hydrophobic compounds. Human GSTs can be divided into five main classes: Alpha, Mu, Pi, Theta, and Zeta. The theta class members GSTT1 and GSTT2 share 55% amino acid sequence identity and both are thought to have an important role in human carcinogenesis. The theta genes have a similar structure, being composed of five exons with identical exon/intron boundaries.

References

Further reading